Robert Jerzy Kołakowski (born 15 March 1963 in Ciechanów) is a Polish politician. He was elected to the Sejm on 25 September 2005, getting 5,335 votes in 16 Płock district as a candidate from the Law and Justice list.

See also
Members of Polish Sejm 2005-2007

External links
Robert Kołakowski - parliamentary page - includes declarations of interest, voting record, and transcripts of speeches.

1963 births
Living people
People from Ciechanów
Members of the Polish Sejm 2005–2007
Law and Justice politicians
Members of the Polish Sejm 2007–2011
Members of the Polish Sejm 2011–2015